The 1941 Detroit Titans football team represented the University of Detroit in the 1941 college football season. Detroit outscored its opponents by a combined total of 195 to 43, and finished with a 7–2 record in its 17th year under head coach and College Football Hall of Fame inductee, Gus Dorais. Significant games included victories over Indiana (14–7) and Oklahoma A&M (20–14) and a close loss to Arkansas (6–9).

In addition to Dorais, the team's coaching staff included Lloyd Brazil (backfield coach, 11th year), Bud Boeringer (line coach, 15th year), and Michael H. "Dad" Butler (trainer, 15th year). During a ceremony at halftime on November 8, Butler, at age 71, was honored for his many years of service as the school's trainer and track and boxing coach; he was presented with $600 in cash, a radio, a "D" blanket, a trophy, a plaque, and scrolls.

Center Vince Banonis, who was later inducted into the College Football Hall of Fame, was the team captain. At the end of the 1941 season, Banonis was chosen as a first-round All-American by Collier's Weekly (selected by Grantland Rice), International News Service, and Paramount News.  He was also chosen as a second-team All-American by the Newspaper Enterprise Association.

Louis Harrington picked three Titans as first-team players on his All-Michigan football team for 1941: Vince Banonis, halfback Elmer L. "Tippy" Madarik, and guard Thomas McLoughlin.

Schedule

References

External links
 1941 University of Detroit football programs

Detroit
Detroit Titans football seasons
Detroit Titans football
Detroit Titans football